The International Van of the Year is an annual award made by the international transport sector. Each year, an expert jury consisting of leading, authoritative specialist journalists selects the International Van of the Year from the new vehicles appearing on the market in Europe.

Results
 2023 Volkswagen ID. Buzz Cargo
 2022 Renault Kangoo and Mercedes-Benz Citan
 2021 Groupe PSA (Stellantis) electric vans (Citroën e-Jumpy, Peugeot e-Expert, Opel/Vauxhall Vivaro-e and Toyota Proace Electric)
 2020 Ford Transit Custom
 2019 Groupe PSA (Peugeot Partner, Citroën Berlingo,  Opel/Vauxhall Combo Cargo and Toyota Proace City)
 2018 Iveco Daily Blue Power 
 2017 Volkswagen Crafter
 2016 Volkswagen Transporter T6
 2015 Iveco Daily
 2014 Ford Transit Connect
 2013 Ford Transit Custom
 2012 Renault Kangoo Z.E.
 2011 Fiat Doblò
 2010 Nissan NV200
 2009 Sevel/Tofaş vans (Fiat Fiorino, Peugeot Bipper and Citroën Nemo)
 2008 Sevel vans (Fiat Scudo, Peugeot Expert and Citroën Jumpy/Dispatch)
 2007 Ford Transit
 2006 Fiat Doblò
 2005 Mercedes-Benz Vito
 2004 Volkswagen Transporter T5
 2003 Ford Transit Connect
 2002 Renault Trafic, Nissan Primastar and Opel/Vauxhall Vivaro
 2001 Ford Transit
 2000 Iveco Daily
 1999 Opel/Vauxhall Movano
 1998 Renault Master
 1997 Peugeot Partner and Citroën Berlingo
 1996 Mercedes-Benz Vito
 1995 Mercedes-Benz Sprinter
 1994 Sevel vans (Fiat Ducato, Peugeot Boxer and Citroën Jumper/Relay)
 1993 Nissan Sunny Van
 1992 Volkswagen Transporter T4

See also
 List of motor vehicle awards

Notes

External links 
 International Van of the Year website

Commercial vehicle awards
Motor vehicle awards